Prof David Meredith Seares Watson FRS FGS HFRSE LLD (18 June 1886 – 23 July 1973) was the Jodrell Professor of Zoology and Comparative Anatomy at University College, London from 1921 to 1951.

Biography

Early life

Watson was born in the Higher Broughton district of Salford, Lancashire, the only son of David Watson, a chemist and pioneering metallurgist, and his wife, Mary Louise Seares.

He was educated at Manchester Grammar School 1899 to 1904 then studied Sciences at the University of Manchester.  He specialised in geology and began to study plant fossils in coal deposits.  In 1907, his final year, he published an important paper on coal balls with Marie Stopes (who had an early career as a paleobotanist); after graduating with first class honours he was appointed as a Beyer fellow at Manchester and went on to complete his MSc in 1909.

After his MSc, Watson continued to develop his wide interest in fossils and studied intensively at the British Museum of Natural History in London, and on extended visits to South Africa, Australia, and the United States. In 1912 he was appointed as a lecturer in Vertebrate Palaeontology, at University College London by Professor James Peter Hill.

His academic work was eventually interrupted in 1916 by World War I when he took a commission in the Royal Naval Volunteer Reserve.  He was later transferred to the nascent Royal Air Force where he worked on balloon and airship fabric design.

Marriage and children

In 1917 Watson married Katharine Margarite Parker, and had two daughters: Katharine Mary and Janet Vida.

Professor of Zoology and Comparative Anatomy

After World War I, Watson returned to academic study and in 1921 he succeeded Hill as the Jodrell Professor of Zoology and Comparative Anatomy and the curator of what is now the Grant Museum of Zoology at UCL. He devoted his energy to the development of the Zoology department there and consolidated his position as a respected academician. In 1922 he was elected a Fellow of the Royal Society, where he gave the Croonian Lecture in 1924.  Four years later, he was invited to give the Romanes Lecture at the University of Oxford; he spoke on "Paleontology and the Evolution of Man".

He was appointed to the British government's Agricultural Research Council in 1931, which involved spending time in the United States where he lectured at Yale University in 1937.  At the outbreak of World War II he returned to Britain to supervise the evacuation of the UCL Zoology department to Bangor, Wales, and then became Secretary of the Scientific Subcommittee of the Food Policy Committee of the War Cabinet.

After the war he continued to teach and to travel widely. He received many awards and academic honours including the Darwin Medal from the Royal Society, the Linnean Medal from the Linnean Society, the Wollaston Medal from the Geological Society of London, and honorary degrees from many universities in Britain and elsewhere. In 1941 Watson was awarded the Mary Clark Thompson Medal from the National Academy of Sciences.

He was elected an Honorary Fellow of the Royal Society of Edinburgh in 1949 having previously won the Society's Makdougall-Brisbane Prize for the period 1936–38.

He retired from his chair in 1951, but continued to study and publish at UCL until his full retirement in 1965. He was awarded the Linnean Society of London's prestigious Darwin-Wallace Medal in 1958.

His scientific research, besides his early original work on fossil plants and coal balls, was chiefly concerned with vertebrate palaeontology, especially fossil reptiles. He amassed a large collection of fossils from his wide travels to Africa and Spain.

He died on 23 July 1973 in Midhurst, Surrey.

DMS Watson Library
The Science library, known as the DMS Watson library, of University College London is named in his honour. It is UCL's second largest library and is in Malet Place adjacent to the Petrie Museum of Egyptian Archaeology.

Famous quotes

This quotation of Watson is often used in Creationist writings in an attempt to show that Watson, and thus by extension promoters of evolution in general, dismiss creationism due to antitheistic bias. A slightly different version of the quotation, derived accurately from a secondhand source, is sometimes used (e.g., by C. S. Lewis):

Watson's original statement first appeared in a 1929 article, "Adaptation," in the journal Nature: The second version of the quotation, given above, is formed by combining the introduction and conclusion of a passage in Watson's paper, one from the first line and one from the last line.  The first passage reads:

The concluding passage reads:

Published works

 "Palaeontology and the Evolution of Man", Romanes Lecture, Oxford, 1928
 The Animal Bones from Skara Brae (1931)
 "Science and Government", the Earl Grey Memorial Lecture, Newcastle upon Tyne, 1942
 "Paleontology and Modern Biology", the Silliman Memorial Lecture, Yale University, 1951
 Many papers on vertebrate palaeontology and connected subjects in Philosophical Transactions, Proceedings of the Zoological Society of London, Journal of Anatomy, and elsewhere.

See also
 :Category:Taxa named by D. M. S. Watson

References

External links
 UCL Library Archive biographical notes, retrieved November 2005.

1886 births
1973 deaths
English zoologists
English taxonomists
Fellows of the Royal Society
Foreign associates of the National Academy of Sciences
Corresponding Members of the USSR Academy of Sciences
Lyell Medal winners
Wollaston Medal winners
Academics of University College London
Royal Navy officers
Royal Naval Volunteer Reserve personnel of World War I
People from Broughton, Greater Manchester
People educated at Manchester Grammar School
British taxonomists
20th-century British zoologists
Jodrell Professors of Zoology and Comparative Anatomy